Yevseviy Politylo (July 12, 1928 – October 24, 2012), romanized to Eusebius Politylo, was the Ukrainian Orthodox metropolitan of Rivne and Ostroh. He was born in Dnipropetrovsk Oblast, and died in Lviv.

Notes

Metropolitan bishops of the Ukrainian Orthodox Church (Moscow Patriarchate)
1928 births
2012 deaths